This article uses an abbreviation for "crore"; it should probably convert all numbers to western style (February 2021)

A list of films produced by the
Bollywood film industry based in Mumbai in 1995.

Top-grossing films
The top films released in 1995 by worldwide gross are as follows:

1995 A–Z

References

External links
 Bollywood films of 1995 at the Internet Movie Database

1995
Lists of 1995 films by country or language
 Bollywood
1995 in Indian cinema